Prostanthera ovalifolia, commonly known as the oval-leaf mintbush or purple mintbush, is a species of flowering plant in the family Lamiaceae and is endemic to south-eastern continental Australia.  It is an erect shrub with egg-shaped leaves and groups of mauve to deep blue-purple flowers arranged in groups at the ends of branchlets.

Description
Flowering occurs from August to November.

Taxonomy
Prostanthera ovalifolia was first formally described in 1810 by Robert Brown in his book Prodromus Florae Novae Hollandiae et Insulae Van Diemen.

Distribution and habitat
Oval-leaf mintbush is widespread in forest growing on sandstone in south-eastern Queensland and eastern New South Wales. It is also sporadically naturalised in the eastern half of Victoria.

Use in horticulture
It grows best in a well-drained soil with some protection from direct summer sun. It should be pruned back by about one third to retain its bushy shape.

References

ovalifolia
Flora of Queensland
Flora of New South Wales
Flora of Victoria (Australia)
Lamiales of Australia
Taxa named by Robert Brown (botanist, born 1773)
Plants described in 1810